Wisconsin is currently divided into 8 congressional districts, each represented by a member of the United States House of Representatives. After the 2020 census, the number of Wisconsin's seats remained unchanged.

Current districts and representatives
List of members of the United States House delegation from Wisconsin, their terms, their district boundaries, and the district political ratings, according to the Cook Partisan Voting Index. The delegation in the 118th United States Congress has a total of 8 members, including 6 Republicans and 2 Democrats.

Historical and present district boundaries
Table of United States congressional district boundary maps in the State of Wisconsin, presented chronologically. All redistricting events that took place in Wisconsin between 1973 and 2013 are shown.

Obsolete districts
Wisconsin Territory's at-large congressional district
Wisconsin's 9th congressional district
Wisconsin's 10th congressional district
Wisconsin's 11th congressional district

See also

List of United States congressional districts

References

"Congressional Districts" (Wisconsin Statutes Chapter 3)
"Wisconsin Legislative Redistricting Information" from the Wisconsin State Legislature.

External links